Eldin Adilović (born 8 February 1986) is a Bosnian retired professional footballer who played as a striker.

International career
Adilović made his official debut for Bosnia and Herzegovina in a December 2010 friendly match against Poland, his second and final international appearance.

Honours

Player
Željezničar
Bosnian Premier League: 2011–12, 2012–13
Bosnian Cup: 2011–12

Individual
Performance
Bosnian Premier League Top Goalscorer: 2011–12 (19 goals)

References

External links

1986 births
Living people
Sportspeople from Zenica
Association football forwards
Bosnia and Herzegovina footballers
Bosnia and Herzegovina under-21 international footballers
Bosnia and Herzegovina international footballers
NK Čelik Zenica players
NK IB 1975 Ljubljana players
NK Ivančna Gorica players
NK Nafta Lendava players
FC Lustenau players
FK Mughan players
Győri ETO FC players
FK Željezničar Sarajevo players
Samsunspor footballers
Şanlıurfaspor footballers
Kayseri Erciyesspor footballers
Premier League of Bosnia and Herzegovina players
Slovenian PrvaLiga players
2. Liga (Austria) players
Azerbaijan Premier League players
Nemzeti Bajnokság I players
TFF First League players
Bosnia and Herzegovina expatriate footballers
Expatriate footballers in Slovenia
Bosnia and Herzegovina expatriate sportspeople in Slovenia
Expatriate footballers in Austria
Bosnia and Herzegovina expatriate sportspeople in Austria
Expatriate footballers in Azerbaijan
Bosnia and Herzegovina expatriate sportspeople in Azerbaijan
Expatriate footballers in Hungary
Bosnia and Herzegovina expatriate sportspeople in Hungary
Expatriate footballers in Turkey
Bosnia and Herzegovina expatriate sportspeople in Turkey